This is a list of estimates of the real gross domestic product growth rate (not rebased GDP) in European countries for the latest years recorded in the CIA World Factbook. The list includes all members of the Council of Europe and Belarus apart from those countries with GDP growth estimates older than 2014.

List

See also
 Economic growth
 GDP

References

GDP growth
Europe
Countries by GDP growth